800 Bullets is a 2002 Spanish film directed by Álex de la Iglesia and penned by the former alongside Jorge Guerricaechevarría. The cast features Sancho Gracia, Ángel de Andrés, Carmen Maura, Eusebio Poncela, Terele Pávez and Luis Castro, among others. The film, a tribute to Spanish stuntmen who worked in Spaghetti Westerns, features similarities to Spielbergian Oedipal melodramas.

Plot
Julián Torralba is a former film stuntman in Almeria, Spain. He and several of his colleagues, who once made a living in American Westerns shot in Spain, now are reduced to doing stunt shows for minuscule audiences on the decaying set built for those old Westerns. Julián wrestles with dark memories of the death of his son, also a stuntman, and with estrangement from his daughter-in-law Laura and her son Carlos.

Carlos, a young boy, becomes intrigued with his late father's life and runs away to join Julián and his band of has-beens. There Carlos is initiated into the rambunctious life of these hard-drinking faux cowboys. But when Laura, a powerful executive looking for a new site for a tourist resort, learns that Carlos has joined the hated Julián, she moves to destroy even this remnant of Julián's once-proud career. Julián and the cowboys decide to fight back the only way they know how.

Cast

Production 
Produced by Pánico Films, 800 Bullets was shot in the province of Almería. Shooting locations included the Paseo de Almería, the Calle Reina Regente (both in the provincial capital, Almería), Santa María del Águila (El Ejido), Las Salinillas (Gádor-Gérgal-Rioja-
Tabernas), Garganta de Alfaro (Rioja) and the Poblado estudio Fort Bravo-Texas Hollywood (Tabernas). The film had a budget of around €5 million.

Release 
The film had its world premiere on 11 October 2002 at the Sitges Film Festival (FICC), making its domestic theatrical release a week later, on 18 October. The film performed bad at the box office, becoming one of the economic blunders in 2002 Spanish cinema, grossing less than €2 million.

Awards and nominations 

|-
| align = "center" rowspan = "4" | 2003 ||  rowspan = "4" | 17th Goya Awards || Best Actor || Sancho Gracia ||  || rowspan = "4" | 
|-
| Best Original Score || Roque Baños || 
|-
| Best Editing || Alejandro Lázaro || 
|-
| Best Special Effects || Juan Ramón Molina, Félix Bergés, Rafael Solórzano || 
|}

See also 
 List of Spanish films of 2002

References 
Citations

Bibliography

External links
 

2002 films
2002 comedy films
Films about stunt performers
Films directed by Álex de la Iglesia
Films set in Spain
Films shot in Almería
Films scored by Roque Baños
Films with screenplays by Jorge Guerricaechevarría
2000s Italian-language films
Spanish adventure comedy films
2000s English-language films
2000s Spanish films